Gerda is a 2021 Russian drama film directed by  (Natalia Kudryashova) and starring Anastasiya Krasovskaya.

Plot 
The film tells about a girl named Lera who lives in the province. Her mother naively believes in miracles, and her father abandoned the family. Lera wants to improve her life, but she doesn't know how. At the same time, she constantly sees dreams in which she sees her soul. And the more difficult life becomes, the more often she sees such dreams.

Cast

Release and accolades
The film screened in the competition program of the 74th Locarno Film Festival in Switzerland in August 2021. 

It was theatrically released in Russia on 14 October 2021.

Awards
Anastasiya Krasovskaya won the Best Actress Award and the special prize from the youth jury of the festival at the Locarno Film Festival.
Best Feature Film in the Stalker Human Rights Film Festival in Moscow

References

External links 
 

2021 films
2020s Russian-language films
Russian drama films
Films about striptease
2021 drama films